Sir Charles Montague Ormsby, 1st Baronet (23 April 1767 – 3 March 1818) was an Anglo-Irish Tory politician.

Ormsby represented Duleek in the Irish House of Commons between 1790 and the constituency's disenfranchisement under the Acts of Union 1800. He subsequently sat as a Tory for Carlow Borough in the House of Commons of the United Kingdom from 1801 to 1806, when he was appointed Recorder of Prince of Wales Island. On 29 December 1812 he was created a baronet, of Cloghans in the Baronetage of the United Kingdom. He was succeeded in his title by his son, James.

References

1767 births
1818 deaths
18th-century Anglo-Irish people
19th-century Anglo-Irish people
Irish MPs 1790–1797
Irish MPs 1798–1800
Baronets in the Baronetage of the United Kingdom
Members of the Parliament of Ireland (pre-1801) for County Meath constituencies
Members of the Parliament of the United Kingdom for County Carlow constituencies (1801–1922)
Tory MPs (pre-1834)
UK MPs 1801–1802
UK MPs 1802–1806